Shadows in the Air is the twelfth studio album by Scottish musician Jack Bruce, released in March 2001. It was the first of two Bruce albums to be co-produced by Kip Hanrahan.

Track listing

 "Out into the Fields" (Pete Brown, Bruce, Corky Laing, Leslie West) – 5:22
 "52nd Street" (Bruce, Kip Hanrahan) – 3:59
 "Heart Quake" (Brown, Bruce) – 5:31
 "Boston Ball Game 1967" (Brown, Bruce) – 2:01
 "This Anger's a Liar" (Bruce, Hanrahan) – 3:21
 "Sunshine of Your Love" (Brown, Bruce, Eric Clapton) – 4:31
 "Directions Home" (Bruce, Hanrahan) – 4:30
 "Milonga" (Bruce, Hanrahan) – 4:53
 "Dancing on Air" (Brown, Bruce) – 4:02
 "Windowless Rooms" (Bruce, Hanrahan) – 5:08
 "Dark Heart" (Bruce, Hanrahan) – 5:59
 "Mr. Flesh" (Bruce, Hanrahan, Vernon Reid) – 2:13
 "He the Richmond" (Brown, Bruce) – 3:19
 "White Room" (Brown, Bruce) – 5:48
 "Surge" (Bruce, Hanrahan) – 1:58

Personnel
Musicians

 Jack Bruce – vocals, bass, acoustic guitar, piano, Vox organ
 Robby Ameen – drums
 Malcolm Bruce – guitar, synthesizer
 Milton Cardona – conga
 Eric Clapton – guitar, vocals, Vox organ
 Dr. John – organ, piano
 Richie Flores – conga
 Andy González – bass
 Jimmy McDonald – accordion
 Gary Moore – guitar
 Vernon Reid – guitar
 Mario Rivera – tenor saxophone
 Piro Rodriguez – trumpet
 Alfredo Triff – violin
 Papo Vasquez – trombone

Production
 Jack Bruce – composer, arranger, producer
 Kip Hanrahan – composer, producer
 Pete Brown – lyricist
 Dick Kondas – engineer
 Jon Fausty – engineer, mixing
 Greg Calbi – mastering
 David Scheinmann – photography
 Mark Saxon – associate producer
 Margrit Seyffer – executive producer

References

2001 albums
Jack Bruce albums
Sanctuary Records albums